Central Yambasa or Nuasua (Nuaswa) is a Southern Bantoid language of Cameroon.

References

Mbam languages
Languages of Cameroon